Malye Lipki is a rural locality (a village) in Gorod Vyazniki, Vyaznikovsky District, Vladimir Oblast, Russia. The population was 144 as of 2010. There are 3 streets.

Geography 
Malye Lipki is located 8 km northwest of Vyazniki (the district's administrative centre) by road. Bolshiye Lipki is the nearest rural locality.

References 

Rural localities in Vyaznikovsky District